Carlos Duarte (June 1, 1957 in Caracas – April 13, 2003) was a Venezuelan composer and pianist.
Duarte's first public recital took place at age 11. At 16, he won the National Composition Prize given by the National Institute of Culture,  an award he would win for three consecutive years from 1973 to 1975. He composed several pieces for piano and orchestra: "Ludios" (Ludus), "Sinfonietta La Mar" (Sea Sinfonietta), and "Concierto de la Canción Triste" (Sad Song Concerto). In 1999, he composed a Quintet for the End of the Century ("Quinteto para el Fin del Siglo") and performed the first performances in the same year, with the Arpeggione Quartet (as a piano quintet) and with the European Union Chamber Orchestra (as a concerto for piano and string orchestra). His last work was a requiem, entitled "Requiem para un Idiota" (Requiem for an Idiot), for piano (as his own voice), chorus, eight clarinets, eight bassoons, eight contrabassoons and eight double basses. It was premiered after his death by the Caracas Municipal Symphony Orchestra (Orquesta Sinfónica Municipal de Caracas) on 30 April 2006, conducted by Rodolfo Saglimbeni, with Arnaldo Pizzolante playing the piano part. Both were among the closest friends of Duarte.

Duarte also composed the incidental piano music for Jav & Jos, The Last Minotaur and Clitemnestra, all performed by the "Theja" Theater Group in the 1990s. Between 1987 and 1990, he was the pianist of the Caracas Municipal Symphony Orchestra. He taught at the Universidad Simón Bolívar Post-Graduate Music Faculty and toured internationally with the Simón Bolivar Orchestra.

References

External links
Biography with works

1957 births
2003 deaths
Musicians from Caracas
20th-century classical composers
20th-century classical pianists
Venezuelan male composers
Venezuelan classical pianists
Academic staff of Simón Bolívar University (Venezuela)
20th-century male musicians